Diane Le Grelle (born 4 May 1952) is a British sports shooter. She competed in the mixed skeet event at the 1992 Summer Olympics.

References

1952 births
Living people
British female sport shooters
Olympic shooters of Great Britain
Shooters at the 1992 Summer Olympics
People from Ekeren
Commonwealth Games medallists in shooting
Commonwealth Games bronze medallists for England
Shooters at the 2006 Commonwealth Games
20th-century British women
21st-century British women
Medallists at the 2006 Commonwealth Games